The Second World is a term originating during the Cold War for the industrial socialist states that were under the influence of the Soviet Union. In the first two decades following World War II, 19 communist states emerged; all of these were at least originally within the Soviet sphere of influence, though some (notably Yugoslavia and China) broke with Moscow and developed their own path of socialism  while retaining Communist governments. Most communist states remained part of this bloc until the dissolution of the Soviet Union in 1991; afterwards, only five communist states remained: China, Cuba, Laos, North Korea, and Vietnam. Along with "First World" and "Third World", the term was used to divide the states of Earth into three broad categories.

Concept
The concept of "Second World" was a construct of the Cold War and the term is still largely used to describe former communist countries that are between poverty and prosperity, many of which are now capitalist states, such as Eastern Europe. Subsequently, the actual meaning of the terms "First World", "Second World," and "Third World" changed from being based on political ideology to an economic definition. The three-world theory has been criticized as crude and relatively outdated for its nominal ordering (1; 2; 3) and sociologists have instead used the words "developed", "developing", and "underdeveloped" as replacement terms for global stratification (which in turn have been criticized as displaying a colonialist mindset); nevertheless, the three-world theory is still popular in contemporary literature and media. This might also cause semantic variation of the term between describing a region's political entities and its people.

Human development
The Three Worlds Model was used to rank the development of countries and their economies during the Cold War. First World countries were capitalist and industrial; they shared similar political and economic institutions, and retained influence over parts of the former colonial world. Second World countries advocated socialism and shared certain characteristics such as centrally planned economic systems, single-party states, and mainly medium income levels. The First World and the Second World were competing for political and economic influence over developing nations known as the Third World.

The Human Development Index is an index used to rank countries and is quantified by looking at a country's human development such as life expectancy, education, and per capita income indicators. The scale is 0-1 and they are put into one of four categories; 0-.55 is low, .55-.70 is medium, .70-.80 is high and very high tops out at .80-1.0.  The Second World countries from the Cold War era currently range from medium human development to very high human development in terms of HDI.

Examples and decline in usage of term
Some examples of Cold-War definition Second World countries were Bulgaria, Czechoslovakia, Hungary, Mongolia, North Korea, Poland, Romania, the Soviet Union, and the German Democratic Republic. In a socio-economic sense, similar to those assumed by the terms First and Third world in the post-Cold War environment, the clearest definition for the Second World would be newly industrialized countries such as Thailand, India, Malaysia, Philippines, Turkey, Mexico, and Brazil. Second World countries are countries that are more stable and more developed than Third World countries which exist in parts of Africa, South and Central America and south Asia, but less stable and less developed than First World countries such as Norway, the United States, or France. Developing countries are countries that are less industrialized and have lower per capita income levels.

The powerful economies of the West are still sometimes described as "First World", but the term "Second World" became largely obsolete following the collapse of the Soviet Union.

See also
 BRIC
 Eurasian Union
 Socialist state
 Developing country
 Third world
 Fourth World

References 

Economic country classifications
Politics by region
Imperialism studies
Cold War terminology